York South—Weston is a provincial electoral district in Toronto, Ontario, Canada, that has been represented in the Legislative Assembly of Ontario since 1999.

Its Member of Provincial Parliament is Progressive Conservative Michael Ford.

Geography
It is in the west-end of Toronto. The riding has a largely working class and immigrant population. The riding is made up largely of the old City of York, a southwestern portion of the old city of North York, and parts of the old city of Toronto north of High Park.

It consists of the part of the City of Toronto bounded by a line drawn from Humber River east along Highway 401, south along the Canadian National Railway situated west of Caledonia Road, west along Rogers Road, southeast along Old Weston Road, west along Lavender Road, south along Keele Street, southeast along the Canadian National/Canadian Pacific Railway, west along the Canadian Pacific Railway, and north along the Humber River to Highway 401.

History

The provincial electoral district was created in 1999 when provincial ridings were defined to have the same borders as federal ridings. Prior to that redistribution, the area included York South and parts of what are now Parkdale-High Park, Davenport, and Eglinton-Lawrence. They became law after Bill 214 (2005), otherwise known as the "Representations Act, 2005",was passed in the Ontario Legislature.  The October 10, 2007 provincial election was conducted using the new boundaries, with only minor changes to the boundaries in the south-east corner of the riding, along the border with the Davenport riding.

1999 electoral district description

York South—Weston consisting of those parts of the cities of North York, Toronto and York described as follows: commencing at the intersection of the westerly limit of the City of North York with the Macdonald-Cartier Freeway (Highway No. 401); thence easterly along the Macdonald-Cartier Freeway to the Canadian National Railway situated immediately west of Caledonia Road; thence southerly along said railway to Rogers Road; thence westerly along Rogers Road to Old Weston Road; thence southerly along Old Weston Road to the northerly limit of the City of Toronto; thence westerly along the northerly limit of the City of Toronto to the Canadian National Railway; thence southeasterly along said railway to the Canadian Pacific Railway; thence westerly along the Canadian Pacific Railway to the westerly limit of the City of York; thence generally northerly along the westerly limit of the cities of York and North York to the point of commencement.

Members of Provincial Parliament

Election results

2007 electoral reform referendum

References

Sources
Elections Ontario Past Election Results
Map of riding for 2018 election

Ontario provincial electoral districts
North York
Provincial electoral districts of Toronto

pt:York South–Weston